Michelotti is an Italian surname, derived from the given name Michele. Notable people with the surname include:

 Biordo Michelotti (1352–1398), Italian mercenary soldier leader
 Giovanni Michelotti (1921–1980), Italian automotive designer
  (1812–1898), Italian naturalist
 Maria Domenica Michelotti (born 1952), Captain Regent of San Marino

Italian-language surnames
Patronymic surnames
Surnames from given names